Amador Pines is an unincorporated community and census-designated place (CDP) in Amador County, California, United States. It is located along California State Route 88, bordered to the south by Buckhorn and to the west by Lockwood. The Census Bureau first designated it as a CDP prior to the 2020 census for statistical purposes.

Demographics

References 

Census-designated places in Amador County, California
Census-designated places in California